This is a list of Western Bulldogs players who have made one or more appearance in the Australian Football League, known as the Victorian Football League until 1990. The Western Bulldogs were previously known as the Footscray Football Club until 1997.

Western Bulldogs players

1920s

1930s

1940s

1950s

1960s

1970s

1980s

1990s

2000s

2010s

2020s

Listed players yet to make their debut for the Western Bulldogs

See also
List of Western Bulldogs coaches

References
AFL Tables – All Time Player List – Western Bulldogs

Western Bulldogs

Western Bulldogs
Western Bulldogs players